Centovetrine is an Italian soap opera broadcast on Channel 5 from 8 January 2001 to 8 August 2016.

The series tells the stories of some of the characters who work or are related to an imaginary shopping center Centovetrine, located in the center of Turin. There are many stories of love and passion, but also struggles for power and dynastic quarrels in the telefilm.

The soap was broadcast in first run ever by Channel 5, and since 2009 it is no longer visible in satellite mode, free to air, but by means of free-to-view satellite TV. 
The replicas of the soap went on air on the pay channel DIVA Universal and free channel A5.

It was broadcast in Croatia sometimes between May 2003 and July 2006, but only 580 episodes from seasons 1 to 3 and 100 episodes from season 4 which lasted total 680 episodes.

In Serbia, more than 1000 episodes from 5 seasons were aired.

Main cast
Actor:               Character:
Roberto Alpi:         Ettore Ferri                      
Elisabetta Coraini:   Laura Beccaria
Sergio Troiano:       Valerio Bettini
Michele D'Anca:       Sebastian Castelli
Marianna De Micheli:  Carol Grimani
Alessandro Mario:     Marco Della Rocca   
Jgor Barbazza:        Damiano Bauer
Alex Belli:           Jacopo Castelli
Barbara Clara:        Viola Castelli
Linda Collini:        Cecilia Castelli
Luciano Roman:        Leo Brera
Jacopo Venturiero:    Adam Vega
Anna Favella:     Alba Boneschi

Past characters
Actor:                   Character:
Serena Bonanno:          Elena Novelli Ferri
Daniela Fazzolari:       Anita Ferri
Lorenc Leka:             Giuliano Corsini
Massimo Bulla:           Gabriele Andreasi
Andrea Bermani:          Federico Bettini
Melania Maccaferri:      Francesca Bettini
Sabrina Marinucci:       Rosa Bianco 
Lina Bernardi:           Sophie Rosseau
Camillo Milli:           Ugo Monti
Clemente Pernarella:     Paolo Monti 
Anna Stante:             Beatrice Le Goff
Francesca Reviglio:      Benedetta Monti
Mary Asiride:            Fatima Hazim
Beatrice Aiello

External links
 
 

Italian television soap operas
Television series set in shops
Canale 5 original programming